Cannabis in New York has been legal for medical purposes under New York law since 2016, and recreational purposes since 2021. As of 2022, recreational cannabis is for sale legally in the state (including Native American reservations).

Adults 21 and older are allowed to possess up to 5 lbs individually in their own homes. In addition, home cultivation of up to three mature and three immature cannabis plants per individual will be permitted, with a maximum of twelve plants per household, once regulations for home grow are in place.

On March 30, 2021, both houses of the New York State Legislature approved legislation to legalize recreational marijuana. The bill was signed into law by former New York Governor Andrew Cuomo on March 31, 2021. The law also resulted in previous marijuana-related criminal records in the state of New York being expunged. As of October 2021 New York State prohibited employers from testing both prospective and current employees for cannabis use or otherwise discriminating against employees who use cannabis outside of work hours.

History

Prohibition (1927)
In 1914, New York first began to restrict cannabis by requiring a prescription to obtain the drug. In an amendment to the Boylan Bill, they added "Cannabis indica, which is the Indian hemp from which the East Indian drug called hashish is manufactured," to the city's list of restricted drugs. The New York Times on the following day commented: "Devotees of hashish are now hardly numerous enough here to count, but they are likely to increase as other narcotics become harder to obtain." In their study of the history of marijuana prohibition, Richard J. Bonnie & Charles H. Whitebread note that "only four articles about marijuana appeared in the major New York newspaper during the entire period from 1914 until 1927." In 1927, New York removed the medical purposes and restricted cannabis completely.

The Brooklyn Public Library reports: this group was held to a high moral standard and was prohibited from "entering saloons, using foul language, and neglecting horses." The Squad found the most weed in Queens but even in Brooklyn dug up "millions of dollars" worth of the plants, many as "tall as Christmas trees". Gleason oversaw incineration of the plants in Woodside, Queens.

La Guardia Committee (1939–1944)

In 1939, New York Mayor Fiorello LaGuardia assigned a committee to investigate the issue of cannabis in his city. The committee released its report in 1944, concluding that the "gateway theory" was largely false, and that cannabis was not widely associated with addiction, school children, or juvenile delinquency. The report infuriated Harry Anslinger, commissioner of the Federal Bureau of Narcotics, who branded it unscientific.

Rockefeller Drug Laws (1973)

In 1973, New York governor Nelson Rockefeller signed legislation increasing the penalty for selling  or more of heroin, morphine, "raw or prepared opium," cocaine, or cannabis or possessing  or more of the same substances, was a minimum of 15 years to life in prison, and a maximum of 25 years to life in prison.

Partial decriminalization (1977)
However, possession in public view remained a misdemeanor, and civil rights advocates stated that this was used as a loophole to unfairly arrest. A New York Times editorial noted in 2012:

New York City further decriminalization (2014)
In response to the continued arrests for marijuana possession, in 2014, New York City mayor Bill de Blasio directed the NYPD to cease arrests, and instead issue tickets, for small possession even in cases where the 1977 law might allow an arrest, such as cannabis entering "public view" during a stop-and-frisk. However, the Village Voice noted in 2016 that despite a sudden drop following de Blasio's direction, arrests have "gone back up just as quickly."

In 2018 the Manhattan and Brooklyn district attorneys announced that they would continue reducing the set of offenses that they would prosecute.

Medical cannabis legalization (2014)

In July 2014, New York Governor Andrew Cuomo signed legislation permitting the use of cannabis for medical purposes, following a "lengthy, emotional debate" in the issue in the Senate and 49–10 Senate vote. Cuomo's signing began an 18-month window for the state Department of Health to enact a medical marijuana program to provide non-smoked methods of cannabis consumption to patients. The legislation awarded five contracts to private marijuana growers who would each be allowed to operate four dispensaries. As of December 2021, the program has 3,455 practitioners and 151,284 patients.

State law as of 2016
Offenses related to the possession or sale of marijuana and "concentrated cannabis", outside those allowed by the state's medical marijuana statute, are defined in Article 221 of the New York State Penal Law. The former term is defined in the state's Public Health Law as "all parts of the plant of the genus Cannabis, whether growing or not; the seeds thereof; the resin extracted from any part of the plant; and every compound, manufacture, salt, derivative, mixture, or preparation of the plant, its seeds or resin." Stalks from the mature plant, fiber, oil and cake made from it, sterilized seeds and compounds or preparations from them are not considered marijuana. "Concentrated cannabis", meant primarily to refer to hashish, refers to the plant's "separated resin, whether crude or purified" and any substance, whether derived from the plant or not, containing more than 2.5% by weight of delta-9-Tetrahydrocannabinol (THC), delta-8 dibenzopyran, delta-1-THC or delta-1 (6) monoterpene, an isomer of the last compound.

Those who do can be fined up to $200; on the third conviction within that time period the maximum fine rises to $250 with the possibility of a 15-day jail sentence as well. The offense is considered a violation, the lowest level of offense defined in state law, and thus does not show up on a criminal record.

Amounts in the  range are fourth-degree criminal possession of marijuana, a Class A misdemeanor for which offenders can receive up to six months in jail. Convictions for these offenses will result in a criminal record.

First-degree criminal possession of marijuana applies to those with more than 10 pounds, a Class C felony for which offenders may spend 15 years in prison.

Sales in the  range get the offender a conviction for second-degree criminal sale of marijuana, a Class D felony. That offense also applies to any sale of a lesser amount to a minor. Sales of more than a pound are considered first-degree criminal sale of marijuana, a Class C felony.

Legalization study (2018)
In his 2018 State of the State address Governor Cuomo urged the New York State Legislature to fund a study on the effects of legalizing marijuana for recreational use. The proposed study would be conducted by the Department of Health to examine a wide variety of issues, including the legal, economic, and social ramifications recreational marijuana could have on New York.

The Department of Health completed its study and recommended the legalization of marijuana in New York, citing economic, public health, and public safety benefits. Cuomo stated that New York should "legalize the adult use of recreational marijuana once and for all," and that his marijuana legalization proposal would be including the state's 2019 budget plan. The study was followed by an amended Marijuana Regulation and Taxation Act bill, which would legalize and regulate cannabis in the state.

Additional reforms with further decriminalization in the State of New York (2019) 
In July 2019, New York enacted legislation signed into law by Governor Andrew Cuomo on July 29, 2019 that further expanded the decriminalization of recreational use of cannabis in the State of New York, but did not legalize it. This measure would treat possession of up to two ounces of marijuana as a violation instead of a crime, with fines dropping to as low as $50.

Recreational legalization (2021) 
Between 2018 and 2021, New York lawmakers repeatedly attempted to legalize recreational cannabis via the legislative process, but disagreements over allocation of tax revenue from cannabis sales (and in the case of the 2020 session, the COVID-19 pandemic) prevented legislation from moving forward. Legalization was included in the 2021 state budget proposal as the Cannabis Regulation and Taxation Act. Members of the New York State Assembly objected to some provisions of the bill, with some expressing a preference to pass their own legislation independent of the governor's office, the Marijuana Regulation and Taxation Act (MRTA).

Negotiations between the governor's office and the legislature over the final cannabis legalization bill were successful and the MRTA was passed in the New York State Assembly and Senate on March 30, 2021 by votes of 94-56 and 40-23, respectively. Governor Andrew Cuomo signed the bill into law the following day. Adults 21 and older are allowed to possess up to 5 lbs individually in their own homes. In addition, home cultivation of up to three mature and three immature cannabis plants per individual will be permitted, with a maximum of twelve plants per household, once regulations for home grow are in place. On April 9, 2021, marijuana-related criminal records in the state of New York which previously resulted in losses of jobs, homes and licenses were confirmed to have been expunged by the law as well.

Aside from driving under the influence, the NYPD no longer lists any other crime related to marijuana.

As of October 2021, New York State prohibited employers from testing both prospective and current employees for cannabis use or otherwise discriminating against employees who use cannabis outside of work hours.

Licensed sale of recreational cannabis in New York is expected to begin by 2023.

As of April 2022, 52 recreational cannabis cultivation licenses have been granted and approved within New York State.

The first legal purchase of recreational cannabis was made in a dispensary operated by Housing Works in Greenwich Village, Manhattan on 29 December 2022.

2022 New York State hemp farmers bill
In February 2022, a bill signed into law by the Governor Kathy Hochul legally allows New York State hemp farmers to start growing cannabis crops. The law also promotes equity for minorities and other related purposes.

New York State tax breaks
In April 2022, the New York Legislature passed a comprehensive omnibus Budget Bill - with provisions that explicitly legally allows cannabis related businesses and/or dispensaries to have "tax breaks" within New York State itself (not federally, due to cannabis still being illegal federally). The Governor of New York is yet to either sign or veto the bill.

Further New York regulations approved
In April 2022, further regulations were approved by state boards - to allow cultivation of medical cannabis on certain licensed farms within New York.

References

Further reading

External links
https://cannabis.ny.gov
Complete Guide - New York Medical Marijuana
New York Medical Marijuana

 
New York